Berthella patagonica is a species of sea slug within the family Pleurobranchidae. The species is found along the coasts of Argentina along Santa Cruz in demersal environments. It grows up to 2.4 centimeters in length.

References 

Pleurobranchidae
Gastropods described in 1835
Molluscs of the Atlantic Ocean
Molluscs of Argentina